Gibostad Chapel is a chapel of the Church of Norway in Senja Municipality in Troms og Finnmark county, Norway. It is located in the village of Gibostad on the east coast of the island of Senja. It is an annex chapel for the Lenvik parish which is part of the Senja prosti (deanery) in the Diocese of Nord-Hålogaland. The white, wooden chapel was built in a long church style in 1939 as a bygdehus, but in 1982 it was upgraded to an official chapel. The chapel seats about 110 people.

See also
List of churches in Nord-Hålogaland

References

External links

Senja
Churches in Troms
Wooden churches in Norway
20th-century Church of Norway church buildings
Churches completed in 1939
1939 establishments in Norway
Long churches in Norway